Events from the year 1653 in France.

Incumbents 
Monarch: Louis XIV

Events
 February 3 – Cardinal Mazarin returns to Paris from exile.
 Petite post, a system of postage using prepaid labels and post boxes, is introduced in Paris by Jean-Jacques Renouard de Villayer.
 Madeleine de Scudéry and her friend, the lutenist Mlle Bocquet, launch a salon.
 Jean-Baptiste Boësset and Jean-Baptiste Lully start their collaboration to produce ballets de cour
 Blaise Pascal publishes his Traité du triangle arithmétique in which he describes Pascal's triangle; and his Traités de l’équilibre des liqueurs in which he explains Pascal's law.

Births
 January 24 – Dom Jacques Alexandre, Benedictine (d. 1734)
 March 1 – Jean-Baptiste-Henri de Valincour, classical scholar (d. 1730)
 March 24 – Joseph Sauveur, mathematician (d. 1716)
 May 8 – Claude Louis Hector de Villars, Marshal of France (d. 1734)
 August 10 – Louis-Guillaume Pécour, dancer and choreographer (d. 1729)
 October 8 – Michel Baron, actor (d. 1729)
 October 20 – Charles-François Poerson, painter (d. 1725)
 Undated
 Sébastien Barras, painter and engraver (d. 1703)
 Jacques-Philippe Ferrand, miniaturist and painter in enamel (d. 1732)
 Nicolas Fouché, painter (d. 1733)

Deaths
 July 10 – Gabriel Naudé, librarian and scholar (b. 1600)
 June 26 – Juliana Morell, Dominican nun and scholar (b. 1594 in Spain)
 September 3 – Claudius Salmasius, classical scholar (b. 1588)
 September 23 – Jacques Goar, Hellenist (b. 1601)
 September 26 – Charles de l'Aubespine, marquis de Châteauneuf, diplomat and government official (b. 1580)

See also

References

1650s in France